I Am Nothing may refer to:
"I Am Nothing", a song by Dope from the 1999 album Felons and Revolutionaries
"I Am Nothing", a song by Withered Hand from Good News
I Am Nothing, a 2012 album by Convictions